Lake of Three Fires State Park is a  state park in Taylor County, Iowa, United States, located near the city of Bedford. The park is centered on the eponymous  Lake of Three Fires. It was established in 1935 and named for a Potawatomi group that once lived there.

The lake features a beach area with a playground, two boat ramps, and several fishing jetties. Fish species in the lake include bluegill, bullhead, and crappie. The park's camping facilities include two campgrounds with electric and non-electric sites, an additional equestrian campground with horse pens, and six cabins. The park has  of multi-use trails which are popular for hiking and horseback riding.

References

State parks of Iowa
Protected areas of Taylor County, Iowa